Robert Leslie Stewart (2 October 1906 – 28 November 1988) was a yachtsman from New Zealand. He competed for New Zealand in the 1956 Summer Olympics in Melbourne, coming 11th in the three-man Dragon class. He was the helmsman, with Albert Cuthbertson and William Swinnerton.

References

Sources
 Black Gold by Ron Palenski (2008, 2004 New Zealand Sports Hall of Fame, Dunedin) p. 86

External links 
 
 

1906 births
1988 deaths
New Zealand male sailors (sport)
Olympic sailors of New Zealand
Sailors at the 1956 Summer Olympics – Dragon